Patrizio Gambirasio (born 23 January 1961) is an Italian former professional cyclist. He is most known for winning one stage in the 1988 Giro d'Italia.

Major results
1981
 1st Gran Premio Industria e Commercio Artigianato Carnaghese
1982
 1st 
 1st Stage 1 Peace Race
 1st Stage 3 Girobio
 1st Stage 1 Settimana Ciclistica Lombarda
1988
 1st Stage 17 Giro d'Italia

Grand Tour general classification results timeline

References

Italian male cyclists
Living people
1961 births
Cyclists from the Province of Bergamo